The LSU Soccer Stadium is a soccer facility located on the campus of Louisiana State University in Baton Rouge, United States. The facility was built in 1996. It serves as the home of the LSU Tigers women's soccer team. The two-level stadium has a seating capacity of 2,197.

In 2010 and 2011, the soccer stadium received extensive renovations which included a second-level of seating, a new press box and wrought-iron style gates and fencing with brick columns were built on the west side of the complex.

See also
LSU Tigers and Lady Tigers
List of soccer stadiums in the United States

References

External links
LSU Soccer Stadium at LSUSports.net

College soccer venues in the United States
LSU Tigers women's soccer venues
Soccer venues in Louisiana
Sports venues in Louisiana
Sports venues completed in 1996
1996 establishments in Louisiana